Fabulous Beast is the third studio album released by Australian rock group Boom Crash Opera. The album was released in March 1993 and peaked at number 15 on the ARIA Charts.

It is the first Boom Crash Opera album not to feature Richard Pleasance who left the band in 1992 after he was diagnosed with Tinnitus.

Track listing
 "My Revelation" - 5:46
 "This Isn't Love" - 3:30
 "In the Morning" - 3:57
 "Bettadaze" - 4:01
 "The Colour of Love" - 4:35
 "Strike a Match" - 3:47
 "Look Up What's Coming Down" - 4:13
 "What a Goodnight" - 4:37
 "You Wouldn't Want to Know" - 4:08
 "I Am Nature" - 4:27
 "Don't Let On" - 4:07
 "The Last Place on Earth" - 4:53

Charts

References

1993 albums
Boom Crash Opera albums
East West Records albums
Albums produced by Don Gehman
Albums produced by Keith Forsey